The following is a list of dams in Akita  Prefecture, Japan.

List

See also

References 

Akita